The Sunda Arc is a volcanic arc that produced the volcanoes that form the topographic spine of the islands of Sumatra, Nusa Tenggara, and Java, the Sunda Strait and the Lesser Sunda Islands. The Sunda Arc begins at Sumatra and ends at Flores, and is adjacent to the Banda Arc. The Sunda Arc is formed via the subduction of the Indo-Australian Plate beneath the Sunda and Burma plates at a velocity of 63–70 mm/year.

Formation and geologic setting 
Mid-oceanic ridge basalts (MORB) form most of the oceanic basin south of Sunda, according to geodynamic studies. These plates began to converge in the Early Miocene. The Indo-Australian Plate is subducting beneath the Eurasian Plate with the dip angle of 49-56 degrees. The slab subducting under Java is continuous down to the lower mantle. However, the slab appears to beak apart under Sumatra Island. Earthquake depth records indicate that there is no deep seismic activity in Sumatra, likely due to the age of the subducting complex.. Two types of subductions have been identified along the Sunda Arc: 1) orthogonal subduction along Java and 2) oblique subduction on the Sumatra side. These subductions are separated by the Sunda Strait.

Notable seismic events 
With the ongoing magmatic activities and the nature of the subduction zone, Sunda Arc experiences major seismic events throughout history. These events cost the loss of lives and vast destruction along the coast. These are some major seismic events that have been recorded.

Tsunami on December 2004, Indian Ocean 
In 2004, the tsunami in Indian Ocean was triggered by an earthquake of 9.15 magnitude near Sumatra Island. In Banda Aceh area, the tsunami height reached up to 35 meters, which surpassed value recorded prior to this event.

Tsunami on July 2006, West Java and Central Java, Indonesia 
A devastating event occurred on July 17, 2006, with major destruction along West Java and Central Java. The Mw-7.7 earthquake-induced tsunami struck over 250 km of the coastline and cost more than 600 deaths. The approximate run-up height was about 4–6 meters.

Historic eruptions and arc volcanism 
The Sunda Arc is home to some of the world's most dangerous and explosive volcanoes. The 1815 eruption of Mount Tambora on Sumbawa and the 1257 eruption of Mount Samalas on Lombok were among the largest in the last two millennia, ranking 7 on the VEI scale. The Sunda Arc subduction zone was also the site of one of the largest known eruptions of the Cenozoic, the VEI 8 Toba supereruption on Sumatra, which expelled 2,800 km³ of magma c. 74,000 BP. The resulting caldera has become Lake Toba. Hundreds of thousands of people have been killed by these eruptions and by episodes of activity at other volcanoes, including Papandayan, Galunggung, Merapi, Kelud, Sinabung and Agung.

Main-arc volcanism 

The main-arc volcanism along Sunda is mainly derived from the interaction between the Indo-Australian Plate and the Eurasia Plate. Magma originates from partial melting of the mantle wedge driven by the fluids from subducting slab. In addition, volcanic rocks from Quaternary generally show more enrichment in alkaline contents than those from Tertiary age. The majority of basalts of the arc have calc-alkaline contents, except for some potassic lava production in East Java.

Back-arc volcanism 
The magmatic activities along the back-arc may or may not relate to the main-arc materials. Magma and lava appear to have originated from molten materials at a deeper part of the mantle as supported by a higher K2O/Na2O ratio in comparison to other part of Sunda Arc. Most salient volcanoes in back-arc region are Lasem, Muria, and Bawean in which their volcanic rocks show complex patterns in terms of chemical signature.

Major islands

Java 
Java Island is located on the east side of Sunda Arc, residing between Sumatra and Bali. Its oceanic crust's thickness is approximately 20-25 kilometers.  With the geological activities and the tectonic nature of Sunda Arc, megathrust earthquakes and volcanic activities are ubiquitous at Java island. Modern volcanoes at Java are formed during Tertiary with typical products of andesitic composition and progressively get more alkali content during Quaternary. Along the Java island, there are approximately 62 geothermal fields which can be utilized for further usages including producing electricity. Java is also a germinal center for supplying gold and cooper in which the occurrences of these low-sulfidication (LS) epithermal deposits may associate with magmatic arc activities with the spatial relationship between the akaditic magma and porphyry Cu-Au deposits.

East Java 
Most volcanic activity in East Java is Plinian-type, which is very explosive and emits columns of hot volcanic debris. The adiakitic magma, which deviates from usual island-arc magma, is associated with porphyry deposits. There is evidence that the Ringgit-Beser volcanic complex also produces potassic and magnesian lava, which could be a result of the decreasing influence of subduction-related material. A major volcano in East Java is Mount Bromo.

Central Java 
There exist two main arcs at Central Java which are Southern Mountain Arc (SMA) and Modern Volcanic Arc (MVA) which give rise to frequent volcanic activities. Prior studies suggested that SMA is formed during Middle Eocene, followed by the subduction that resulted in the formation of MVA in Late Eocene. Central Java is home to one of the most notorious volcanoes, Merapi,  as well as other major volcanoes such as Merbabu, Muria, and Slamet.

Mount Merapi is the most active volcano in Indonesia which erupt periodically every 2–6 years and has shown perennial volcanic activities dated back roughly 2000 years ago based on carbon isotropic signatures.  The earliest eruption has been approximated to be roughly 40,000 years ago. The most recent significant eruptions occurred in 1994, 2006, and 2010. Mount Merapi is a steep stratovocano situated on Central Java Island with its seismic and volcanic activities that could pose major threats to countless lives and infrastructures in its vicinity. Most recent volcanic activities are induced by the collapse of lava dome, contributing to highly explosive eruption of andesitic materials.

West Java 
The volcanic activities in this region have begun roughly since Pliocene or Pleistocene epoch. There are two major volcanic zones called the volcanic front (VF) and the rear arc (RA) with different chemical imprints. The geochemical study of major and trace elements and isotopic signatures of lava have confirmed the steady-state subduction and ongoing replenishment of magma for about 10 Ma. The volcanic rocks founded on West Java are dated back to the Eocene. The basement of West Java is continental lithosphere which can be inferred from crustal assimilation and contamination in volcanic rocks.

Krakatoa
The island of Anak Krakatau has grown at an average rate of five inches (13 cm) per week since the 1950s. Quiet periods of a few days have alternated with almost continuous Strombolian eruptions since 1994. In 1883 CE, tsunami were triggered by the eruption of Krakatoa with the run-up of 41 meters. The magnitude of damage reached Panama, which was located almost 19,300 km away from the focus.

Sumatra 
Sumatra island is located on the southwest side of Sunda Arc. The main seismic zone of Sumatra is the Sumatra Fault System (SFS), which trends NW-SE. The subducting oceanic crust are dated to be approximately 50 to 90 Ma. A K/Ar study reveals that subducted-related magmatism in Sumatra started roughly in early Mesozoic according to the evidences derived from the plutonic body on Barisan Mountain. The key mineralization found on Sumatra are epithermal veins of Au, Ag, Zn, Pb, and other metals in which these ore bodies are correlated to arc volcanism and subvolcanism intrusive bodies.

Mount Sinabung is a stratovolcano of andesite and dacite in the Karo plateau of North Sumatra, 40 kilometres (25 mi) from the Lake Toba supervolcano. It has been continuously active since 2013.

Nusa Tenggara 
Nusa Tenggara lies at the east side of Sunda. The information and study on this island are scarce compared to Java due to the difficulty of access. Generally, the island is composed on Quaternary volcanic deposits. Major volcanoes in Nusa Tenggara are Kelimutu and Mount Rinjani. Seismic studies have shown clusters of seismic events beneath active island-arc volcanoes, which may be a result from the collision zone.

See also
List of volcanoes in Indonesia

References

Further reading
 Newcomb KR & McCann WR. (1987). Seismic history and seismotectonics of the Sunda Arc. Journal of Geophysical Research; 92:421–439.

Arcs of Indonesia
Volcanic arcs
x
x
Geology of Indonesia
Plate tectonics